Winfried Menrad  (10 February 1939 – 26 August 2016) was a German politician. A member of the Christian Democratic Union, Menrad served in the European Parliament from 1989 to 2004.

References

External links

1939 births
2016 deaths
Christian Democratic Union of Germany MEPs
MEPs for Germany 1989–1994
MEPs for Germany 1994–1999
MEPs for Germany 1999–2004